Amar Ćatić (born 21 January 1999) is a Bosnian professional footballer who plays as a winger for Eerste Divisie club Den Haag.

Ćatić started his professional career at PSV, playing mainly in its reserve team, before joining Den Haag in 2020.

Club career

Early career
Ćatić started playing football at a local club DESK, before joining Willem II's youth setup. In 2010, he moved to PSV's youth academy. He made his professional debut in UEFA Europa League play-offs against Apollon Limassol on 29 August 2019 at the age of 20.

In July 2020, he switched to Den Haag.

International career
Ćatić represented Bosnia and Herzegovina at various youth levels.

Career statistics

Club

References

External links

1999 births
Living people
Footballers from Tilburg
Dutch people of Bosnia and Herzegovina descent
Citizens of Bosnia and Herzegovina through descent
Bosnia and Herzegovina footballers
Bosnia and Herzegovina youth international footballers
Bosnia and Herzegovina under-21 international footballers
Bosnia and Herzegovina expatriate footballers
Association football wingers
PSV Eindhoven players
Jong PSV players
ADO Den Haag players
Eerste Divisie players
Eredivisie players
Bosnia and Herzegovina expatriate sportspeople in the Netherlands